Robert Douglas Gryp (born May 6, 1950) is a Canadian former professional ice hockey player.

Originally selected by the Toronto Maple Leafs in the 1970 NHL Entry Draft, Gryp played for the Boston Bruins and Washington Capitals.

Career statistics

External links

Profile at hockeydraftcentral.com

1950 births
Boston Braves (AHL) players
Boston Bruins players
Boston University Terriers men's ice hockey players
Canadian ice hockey forwards
Ice hockey people from Ontario
Johnstown Jets players
Living people
New Haven Nighthawks players
Richmond Robins players
Toronto Maple Leafs draft picks
Washington Capitals players
Canadian expatriate ice hockey players in the United States
NCAA men's ice hockey national champions